The discography of American singer Bryson Tiller consists of three studio albums, one mixtape, one extended play, 23 singles and 12 music videos. He started his career in 2011, releasing the mixtape Killer Instinct Vol.1. In October 2015, Tiller released his debut studio album, Trapsoul, which reached number eight on the US Billboard 200. Two of the album's singles, "Don't" and "Exchange", have peaked in the top 40 of the US Billboard Hot 100. Tiller's second studio album, True to Self, was released on May 26, 2017, and peaked at number one on the US Billboard 200, becoming his first number-one album in the country.

Albums

Studio albums

Mixtapes

Extended plays

Singles

As lead artist

As featured artist

Other charted songs

Guest appearances

Music videos

As lead artist

As featured artist

Songwriting credits
The following list shows Tiller's songwriting credits for other acts. He is also the co-writer of all of his albums' songs.

Notes

References

External links
 
 

Rhythm and blues discographies
Discographies of American artists